D15 may refer to:
 Allis-Chalmers D15, an American tractor
 DA-15, an electrical connector
 Dewoitine D.15, a French fighter aircraft
 Dublin 15, a postal district in Ireland
 , a G- and H-class destroyer of the Royal Hellenic Navy
 , a Nairana-class escort carrier of the Royal Navy
 LNER Class D15, a British steam locomotive class
 LSWR D15 class, a British steam locomotive class
 Pennsylvania Railroad class D15, an American steam locomotive
 Slav Defense, a chess opening